Released by Christian rock singer and Stryper frontman, Michael Sweet, in 2000, Truth is the official full-length Restless Records version of the demo album of the same name Sweet independently released two years earlier (1998).

The 1998 demo album sold independently through Sweet's website and did very well selling 25,000 units. This prompted several labels to seek rights to release the album.

The 2000 official album features eight of the ten songs included in the 1998 demo (songs "One" and "Rain" are not included), presented with new arrangements and a more polished sound and mix. It additionally features four new songs ("All I'm Thinking Of (Is You)", "Save Me", "Ever After", and "Tomorrow") and new album artwork.

Sweet's Stryper bandmate, Oz Fox, features on the song "The Ever After" performing a guitar solo.

Track listing

Personnel
Michael Sweet - lead vocals, guitars
Chris Miles - bass guitar
Kenny Aronoff - drums, percussion
Bob Marlette - keyboards, organ, piano, strings, mellotron
Oz Fox - guitar solo on track 7
Tim Pierce - guitar solo on track 1, slide on track 6
Suzy Katayama - orchestration on track 4
Peter Vantine - piano, orchestration on track 12
Steve Hunt - additional strings on track 9

Production crew
Produced by Bob Marlette and Michael Sweet
Engineered and mixed by Bob Marlette
Recorded at Sound Techniques, Boston; The Blue Room and A&M Studios, Los Angeles

References

2000 albums
Michael Sweet albums
Albums produced by Bob Marlette
Restless Records albums